The Ioniveyem (also Ионивээм Ioniveem, Yeni-Veyem and Yoniveem) is a river located in the Chukotka Peninsula in Far East Siberia, Russia. It flows northwards into the Kolyuchinskaya Bay, Chukchi Sea.

The mountain called "Gora Ioni" is located close to it to the east in mid course.

This river and its basin belong to the Chukotka Autonomous Okrug administrative region of Russia.

References

 Geographic Location
 Northeast Asia in the Late Pleistocene and Early Holocene
  Hydrographic and Environmental data
   Biological imaging

Rivers of Chukotka Autonomous Okrug
Drainage basins of the Chukchi Sea